Cell 2455, Death Row is a 1955 American crime film noir directed by Fred F. Sears and starring William Campbell and Robert Wright Campbell. It is based on the 1954 book of the same name.

Plot

A death row inmate uses his prison-law studies to fight for his life.

Cast
 William Campbell as Whit Whittier
 R. Wright Campbell as Whit as a Boy (as Robert Campbell)
 Marian Carr as Doll
 Kathryn Grant as Jo-Anne
 Harvey Stephens as Prison Warden 
 Vince Edwards as Hamiton 
 Allen Nourse as Serl Whittier 
 Diane DeLaire as Hallie Whittier
 Bart Braverman as Whit, as a Young Boy (as Bart Bradley)
 Paul Dubov as Al
 Tyler MacDuff as Nugent
 Buck Kartalian as Monk
 Eleanor Audley as Blanche 
 Thom Carney as Hatcheck Charlie 
 Joseph Forte as Lawyer (as Joe Forte)
 Howard Wright as Judge

Production
Columbia Pictures acquired the rights to Caryl Chessman's book Cell 2455, Death Row: A Condemned Man's Own Story for $10,000 in June 1954. Columbia planned the film as a documentary-type story and did not intend that the film should advocate for Chessman's innocence.

See also
List of American films of 1955

References

External links

 
 

1955 crime drama films
1955 films
American black-and-white films
American prison drama films
Columbia Pictures films
1950s English-language films
Films about capital punishment
Films based on biographies
Films set in California
Films directed by Fred F. Sears
1950s American films